Loved is a 1997 film directed by Erin Dignam and starring Robin Wright Penn and William Hurt.

Plot 
After a husband is accused of driving his third wife to suicide, his first wife Hedda—a troubled woman who can't hate or hurt others even if they had wronged her—is subpoenaed to testify on his abusive behavior during their marriage.

Cast  
 Robin Wright Penn as Hedda Amerson
 William Hurt as K.D. Dietrickson
 Amy Madigan as Brett Amerson
 Anthony Lucero as The Defendant
 Paul Dooley as Leo Amerson
 Lucinda Jenney as Kate Amerson
 Joanna Cassidy as Elenore Amerson
 Sean Penn as Michael

Reception
Radio Times rated it one star, saying, "No doubt all the people involved in this project had their hearts and best intentions in the right place, but this drama ultimately fumbles the sensitive subject of domestic violence."

See also 
 
List of American films of 1997
List of drama films
List of thriller films of the 1990s

References

External links 
 
 
 

1990s thriller drama films
1997 films
American independent films
American thriller drama films
Films about domestic violence
1997 drama films
1990s English-language films
1990s American films